was a scholar, poet, and politician of the Heian Period of Japan. He is regarded as an excellent poet, particularly in Kanshi poetry, and is today revered in Shinto as the god of learning, .

Biography

His grandfather, Sugawara no Kiyotomo, served the court, teaching history in the national school for future bureaucrats and even attained the third rank. His father, Sugawara no Koreyoshi, began a private school in his mansion and taught students who prepared for the entrance examination to the national school or who had ambitions to be officers of the court, including his own son Michizane.

Michizane passed the entrance examination, and entered Daigaku, as the national academy was called at the time. After graduation he began his career in the court as a scholar as a relatively prestigious senior sixth rank upper in 870.  His rank coincided with his role initially as a minor official in the Court bureaucracy under the Ministry of Civil Affairs.  By 874 Michizane had reached the fifth rank (his father the fourth rank), and served briefly under the Ministry of War before being transferred to a more desirable role in the Ministry of Popular Affairs.  His training and skill with Classical Chinese language and literature afforded him many opportunities to draft edicts and correspondences for officials in the Court in addition to his menial duties. Records show at this time he composed three petitions for Fujiwara no Yoshifusa as well as the Emperor.  Michizane also took part in receiving delegations from the Kingdom of Parhae, where Michizane's skill with Chinese again proved useful in diplomatic exchanges and poetry exchange.  In 877, he was assigned to the Ministry of the Ceremonial, which allowed him to manage educational and intellectual matters more than before.

In 877, he was also promoted to professor of literature at the academy, Later, he was also appointed  the highest professorial office at Daigaku. This office was considered to be the highest honor a historian could achieve.

Early career 
In 886, Sugawara was appointed to be governor of Sanuki Province. Modern research shows that many bureaucrats in the Court, if they lacked sufficient clout, were assigned at least one term in a remote province, and Michizane was no exception.  During his four-year tenure in the province, Michizane's informal poetry increased, and up to 26% of his poetry still extant was composed in this narrow time.  Among his duties, based on limited records, was to tour the province, recommend outstanding individuals to the Court, and to punish as needed.  In 887, Michizane had to petition the Buddhas and the Shinto kami to help relieve a drought at the time.  Records of the time imply that Michizane's time as governor had met with only middling success.

Conflict with Fujiwara clan 
Michizane, defending the court scholars sent a letter of censure to Mototsune, and gained the favor of Emperor Uda. With his term as governor completed in 890, Michizane returned to the Court in Kyoto. In Emperor Uda's struggles to restore power to the Imperial Family, away from the Fujiwara, a number of officials from non-Fujiwara families were promoted to key positions, including Imperial offshoots in the Minamoto family and Sugawara no Michizane. In a rapid series of promotions beginning in 891, Michizane rose to the senior third rank in 897. According to one document signed by Michizane in 894, he already held the following posts in the Court:

 Ambassador to the Tang Dynasty.
 Consultant
 Assistant Investigator of the Records of Outgoing Officials
 Junior Fourth Rank Lower
 Major Controller of the Left
 Supernumerary Senior Assistant Minister of Ceremonial
 Assistant Master of the Crown Prince's Household (later Emperor Daigo)

He was appointed ambassador to China in the 890s, but instead came out in support of abolition of the imperial embassies to China in 894, theoretically in consideration for the decline of the Tang Dynasty. On the other hand, some historians point to a power struggle between Michizane and his political rivals, the influential Fujiwara no Tokihira and other Fujiwara clans, as another reason for Sugawara Michizane to advise the emperor to abolish the Japanese envoys to Tang. The theory is that if Michizane had been sent to Tang as an ambassador, he would have been removed from the center of power at the court, and he advised the emperor to abolish the envoys to avoid this.

Within the abdication of Emperor Uda, Michizane's position became increasingly vulnerable.  In 901, through the political maneuverings of his rival, Fujiwara no Tokihira, who accused him of favouring Prince Tokiyo over the crown prince as the main successor to the emperor's throne, Michizane was demoted from his aristocratic rank of junior second to a minor official post at Dazaifu, in Kyūshū's Chikuzen Province where he and his entire family was banished. He died in exile in 903.

Pacification and deification 

After Michizane's death, plague and drought spread and sons of Emperor Daigo died in succession. The Imperial Palace's Great Audience Hall (shishinden) was struck repeatedly by lightning, and the city experienced weeks of rainstorms and floods. Attributing this to the angry spirit of the exiled Sugawara, the imperial court built a Shinto shrine called Kitano Tenman-gū in Kyoto, and dedicated it to him. They posthumously restored his title and office, and struck from the record any mention of his exile. Even this was not enough, and 70 years later Sugawara was deified as Tenjin-sama, a god of sky and storms. Eventually Tenjin evolved into a benign kami of scholarship. 

Today many Shinto shrines in Japan are dedicated to him.
He became the most notable example of an interesting spiritual transformation: a vengeful Japanese spirit, onryō or goryō, often a former aristocrat who was wrongfully killed, and consequently seeking revenge, becomes a benign deity through ritual pacification and posthumous honors.

Poetry
Michizane had an exceptional talent in poetry both for waka (poetry in Japanese) and kanshi (poetry in Chinese).

Like his father, Michizane had a talent for poetry, and it is said that he began composing  at the age of five. Michizane is traditionally credited with the Shinsen Man'yōshū, but the attribution has been challenged.

One of his  was included in Fujiwara no Teika's Ogura Hyakunin Isshu:

The poem was originally the 420th of the Kokin Wakashū.

Another of his famous  is a poem written in 901 just before he left Kyoto for Daizaifu by demotion. He felt deep sorrow that he would never see his precious plum tree in his residence in Kyoto again, so he talked endearingly to it:

Nioi okose yo can be interpreted as "spread your scent" rather than "flourish in full bloom", although such a usage of the word nioi as "scent" or "smell" is relatively modern and rare in the classical period. The above is from the 1006th poem of the Shūi Wakashū; although this is the original form of this poem, when re-collected later in Hōbutsushū, the last phrase was modified into haru na wasure so (meaning remains unchanged), which became its popular variation. A more realistic legend says Michizane or his friend transplanted its seedling to Dazaifu.

He was also interested in kanshi, because in those days the immersion in the Chinese culture was regarded as a proof of refinement and scholarship. Since his excellence in kanshi was well known throughout the Court, Emperor Daigo suggested him to compile his Chinese poems, and therefore he published  and dedicated it to the emperor in 900. The work contained 46 kanshi, was completed sometime before his death in 903. He sent it to  right before his death.

Honours
Senior First Rank (June 12, 993; posthumous)

Descendants
The lineage of the Sugawara clan was divided into six families by the 18th century. Aside from these noble families, there are several (often self-proclaimed) branches in the samurai caste, including Maeda and Yagyū.

 Sugawara no Takasue (972–?) – an aristocrat, Michizane's great-grandson
 Takasue's daughter (c.1008 – after 1059) – a female writer known for Sarashina Nikki
 Aristocratic families (Takatsuji, Gojō, Higashibōjō, Karahashi, Kiyooka, and Kuwabara)
 Takako Irie (1911–1995) – an actress, a daughter of Viscount Yoshinaka Higashibōjō.
 Maeda clan
 Maeda Toshiie (1538–1599) – a daimyō lord. Toshiie self-proclaimed to be a descendant of Michizane and after decades the Tokugawa shogunate officially recognized his claim in Kan'ei Shoka Keizu Den (1643), but its historicity is highly dubious
 Yagyū clan – self-proclaimed to be a descendant of an officer called Sugawara no Nagayoshi
 Yagyū Munetoshi (1529–1606) – the founder of Yagyū Shinkage-ryū (a school of swordsmanship)
 Yagyū Munenori (1571–1646) – the head sword instructor of Tokugawa shōguns, author of A Hereditary Book on the Art of War

See also

 Nihon Sandai Jitsuroku, the last of the Six National Histories; the de jure lead editor was Fujiwara no Tokihira but the de facto lead editors were Michizane and Ōkura no Yoshiyuki (大蔵善行).
 Ruijū Kokushi, a categorized and chronological history text
 Kitano Tenman-gū
 Dazaifu Tenman-gū
 Yushima Tenman-gū
 Tenjin is also revered each July at two yamaboko floats—Abura Tenjin Yama and Arare Tenjin Yama—in Kyoto's famous Gion Festival. 
 Taira no Masakado, another influential figure from Japan's past who, like Michizane, was eventually deified as a guardian spirit

Footnotes

Explanatory notes

Citations

Bibliography
Robert Borgen (1994). Sugawara no Michizane and the Early Heian Court. University of Hawaii Press
 
McMillan, Peter 2010 (1st ed. 2008). One Hundred Poets, One Poem Each. New York: Columbia University Press.
Suzuki Hideo, Yamaguchi Shin'ichi, Yoda Yasushi 2009 (1st ed. 1997). Genshoku: Ogura Hyakunin Isshu. Tokyo: Bun'eidō.

Further reading

 Morris, Ivan (1975).  The Nobility of Failure: Tragic Heroes in the History of Japan. London: Secker & Warburg. .

 
845 births
903 deaths
Articles containing Japanese poems
Japanese deities
Japanese male poets
Japanese politicians
Japanese scholars
Kuge
People from Dazaifu, Fukuoka
People of Heian-period Japan
Writers from Fukuoka (city)
9th-century Japanese poets
Hyakunin Isshu poets
9th-century Japanese calligraphers
Japanese ambassadors to the Tang dynasty
Tenjin faith
Deified Japanese people
Kabuki characters